Edward Fitzpatrick O’Keefe is the Chief Executive Officer of the Theodore Roosevelt Presidential Library Foundation, and a former media executive. O’Keefe worked at ABC News, before serving as the founding Editor-in-Chief of media start-up NowThis. After working at NowThis for two years, O’Keefe moved to CNN to lead the strategy and growth of CNN businesses including CNNMoney, CNN Politics, and Travel. In 2019, O’Keefe was accepted as a fellow at the Harvard Kennedy School, where he researched the future of journalism and streaming news, publishing his findings in his paper “Streaming War Won.” During his time at Harvard, O’Keefe also conducted research on Theodore Roosevelt. After leaving Harvard, O’Keefe spent time consulting news organizations and continuing research before announcing his upcoming book and  role as CEO of the Theodore Roosevelt Presidential Library.

Background 
Edward F. O’Keefe was born in Grand Forks, North Dakota to William G. O’Keefe and Heather C. (Holmes) O’Keefe on February 16, 1978. O’Keefe attended Red River High School, whose mascot is the Roughrider, in honor of Theodore Roosevelt’s Rough Rider volunteer cavalry that fought in the Spanish-American War. O'Keefe credits several of his hometown teachers for planting the seeds for his career, as they gave him early exposure to the arts, politics, and history. O’Keefe graduated in 1996 and went on to study Government and Psychology & English at Georgetown University in Washington, D.C., where he graduated with honors cum laude.

O’Keefe now lives in New York with his wife, Allison Davis O’Keefe, a photographer, and two children.

Career

ABC 
After graduating from Georgetown University in 2000, O’Keefe began his career as an entry-level desk assistant at ABC. He would continue at ABC as a reporter & producer covering Capitol Hill and the 2004 presidential campaign; producer at This Week with George Stephanopoulos; Senior Political Editor; Managing Editor of ABCNews.com; and finally Executive Producer of ABCNews.com.

O’Keefe’s first day on Capitol Hill was 9/11. Assigned to work as a producer for Linda Douglass, O’Keefe arrived on Capitol Hill before the terrorist attacks. Douglass and O’Keefe convinced then-Senator Joe Biden (D-Dela.) to appear on ABC News. Biden was the first government official to declare publicly the terrorist attacks were likely conducted by al-Qaeda.

O’Keefe is credited with breaking the story that led to the eventual resignation of then-Senate Majority Leader Trent Lott. Lott, at the 100th birthday party for Sen. Strom Thurmond (R-Miss.), remarked that if Thurmond, who ran on a segregationist platform in 1948 had won, “we wouldn’t have had all these problems all these years.” After the ABC News programs World News Tonight with Peter Jennings, Nightline, and Good Morning America declined to run the story on television, O’Keefe wrote the story for ABCNews.com. It was the first time an online blog story led to major breaking news and O’Keefe’s effort became the subject of a Harvard University study: “Big Media Meets the Bloggers: Coverage of Trent Lott’s Remarks at Strom Thurmond’s Birthday Party."

O’Keefe covered the 2004 presidential election. On the road for nearly 16 months with Sen. John Kerry, O’Keefe was first to report Kerry’s concession live on-air in an ABC News Special Report with Charlie Gibson.

Back in Washington, DC after the 2004 election, O’Keefe covered the Senate confirmation hearings of Chief Justice John Roberts and Justice Samuel Alito to the Supreme Court alongside George Stephanopoulos. O’Keefe then joined Stephanopoulos at the Sunday show This Week with George Stephanopoulos. For both the program and the web, O’Keefe interviewed George Clooney on Darfur, Nora Ephron, Stephen Colbert, Sigourney Weaver, and John Updike, among others.

As Executive Producer, O’Keefe guided the editorial direction of ABCNews.com. He served as the editorial lead for the website & social media, and brokered a partnership between Yahoo! and ABC News.

NowThis 
After a 12-year stint at ABC, O’Keefe became the founding editor-in-chief of the media start-up NowThis in 2012.

CNN 
After two years at NowThis, O’Keefe became the VP of CNNMoney and CNN Politics. In 2016, O’Keefe took on the role as SVP of Premium Content, overseeing  strategy for CNN's Money, Politics, Style, Tech, Travel, Media & Entertainment, Arabic, and HLN divisions. In 2018, O’Keefe became the SVP of Content Development, overseeing CNN’s mobile, social, video, podcast, virtual reality, newsletter, and subscription services. These efforts included The Axe Files with David Axelrod, and CNN’s original documentary podcast Election 2000: Over/Time. O'Keefe also was involved in launching the Emmy-award winning ExplorePartsUnknown.com, the digital component to the Emmy and Peabody award winning Parts Unknown series with Anthony Bourdain.

Harvard Kennedy School 
In January 2019, the Shorenstein Center on Media, Politics and Public Policy, based at the Harvard Kennedy School, announced its Spring 2019 class of fellows, which included people ranging from Adam Serwer, Maria Hinojosa, and O’Keefe. At Harvard, O'Keefe published research on news streaming in his paper “Streaming War Won.” He also spent time conducting research on Theodore Roosevelt–examining unpublished letters, correspondence, and written records, particularly originating during Roosevelt’s time in North Dakota. O’Keefe conducted this research primarily for his forthcoming book, The Loves of Theodore Roosevelt.

Theodore Roosevelt Presidential Library 
While at Harvard, O’Keefe encountered fellow North Dakotan, former advisor for North Dakota Governor Doug Burgum, and Theodore Roosevelt Presidential Library & Museum board member Robert Lauf, who encouraged O’Keefe to meet with Governor Burgum. Through this connection, Lauf and Burgum brought O’Keefe to become the CEO of the Theodore Roosevelt Presidential Library Foundation.

Under O'Keefe's leadership, the Foundation has set out broad guiding principles of Conservation, Leadership, and Citizenship to explore Roosevelt's life and legacy.

Awards and recognition 
O’Keefe was Executive Producer of Explore Parts Unknown, winning a Primetime Emmy for Outstanding Short Form Nonfiction or Reality Series, 2018.

He is also the recipient of the Edward R. Murrow Award for Social Media (2017), and two Webby Awards for Anthony Bourdain: Explore Parts Unknown and 2016 Election, #MyVote.

O’Keefe was nominated for a News & Documentary Emmy for “Enemy #1: The Hunt for Osama Bin Laden” (2012) and the Joan S. Barone Award for “Congress in Crisis” (2003).

He is the recipient of the George Foster Peabody Award, honoring the work of ABC News covering the devastating terrorist attacks on 9/11.

References

External links 
 trlibrary.com
 https://shorensteincenter.org/fellowships/former-fellows-by-semester/spring-2019-fellows/
 https://twitter.com/edwardokeefe
 https://www.governing.com/podcast/arena/Ed-OKeefe-on-Preserving-the-Past-and-Defining-the-Future.html
 https://www.cnn.com/interactive/2018/07/politics/election-2000-over-time/
 https://explorepartsunknown.com/
 https://shorensteincenter.org/streaming-war-won/

1978 births
Living people
American chief executives
Georgetown University alumni
Harvard Kennedy School alumni
People from Grand Forks, North Dakota